Frances Garrett (born June 17, 1999), known professionally as Frances Forever, is an American singer-songwriter. They are best known for their song "Space Girl", which became a viral hit on TikTok in 2020.

Early life
Frances Garrett grew up outside of Baltimore and was homeschooled as a child. They started playing piano at six years old and began writing songs as a teenager. A summer intensive at Berklee College of Music convinced them to pursue music professionally. They chose the stage name "Frances Forever" as a play on their first name and as an homage to the song "Francis Forever" by Mitski.

Career
Garrett began their career with the release of their first EP Pockets in 2018. The EP featured songs written on single instruments that represent "pockets" of Garrett's life. They later submitted their song "Space Girl" as an entry to be on NPR's Tiny Desk Concerts series. Though the entry was not chosen, Boston's WBUR-FM selected the song as their favorite submission from Massachusetts, calling Garrett's songwriting "reminiscent of the smart bedroom pop of peers like Sidney Gish and Clairo, cheerful-sounding ditties that belie more complicated emotions: sadness, longing, resentment". Garrett also went on to perform a headlining slot at WBUR's CityScape event on August 23, 2019.

"Space Girl" was officially released as a single on March 27, 2020, and became a viral hit through TikTok, garnering over 10 million streams on streaming services. In December 2020, the song debuted at number 23 on the Billboard Hot Alternative Songs chart. On December 16, 2020, Garrett was officially signed to Mom + Pop Music. A remix of "Space Girl" featuring Chloe Moriondo was released on January 29, 2021. A music video for the song was released on March 3, 2021, followed by the release of their second EP Paranoia Party on July 9, 2021. In a August 2021 Dork interview, Garrett cited Taylor Swift as their musical inspiration, and that they grew up with Swift's music.

Personal life
Garrett is pansexual and non-binary and uses singular they pronouns. They were diagnosed with ADHD as a child. In 2021, Garrett earned a degree in music and music technology from Clark University.

Discography

Extended plays

Singles

As lead artist

As featured artist

References

1999 births
American indie pop musicians
American TikTokers
Bedroom pop musicians
Clark University alumni
21st-century American singers
Musicians from Baltimore
Singer-songwriters from Massachusetts
Living people
American LGBT musicians
LGBT people from Maryland
LGBT TikTokers
Non-binary musicians
Pansexual musicians
Singer-songwriters from Maryland
Pansexual non-binary people